Kteatus is a genus of ground beetles in the family Carabidae. This genus has a single species, Kteatus bruchi, found in Argentina.

References

Lebiinae
Beetles described in 1936